Haunt is an EP by English indie pop band Bastille. It was released exclusively to the United States in May 2013 digitally and July 2013 physically. It features three songs from their debut album Bad Blood. It also features a demo track, the title track of the EP, that was originally the B-side to the "Bad Blood" single. The EP peaked at number 104 on the Billboard 200 and number one on the Top Heatseekers chart.

Track listing
All songs written and composed by Dan Smith

Charts

References

External links
 Haunt EP | Bastille

2013 EPs
Indie pop EPs
Bastille (band) albums